
Tom Polo (born 1985) is an Australian artist based in Sydney, New South Wales. His work has been exhibited in group and solo exhibitions in several capital cities of Australia as well as in London, England.

He holds a Bachelor of Fine Arts (Hons) and Master of Fine Arts from the UNSW College of Fine Arts.

Awards and residencies
Polo was the inaugural recipient of the Parramatta Artists' Studios residency in 2007, and continued to work there until 2014. Other awards and residencies include:

2011: Art & Australia / Credit Suisse Private Banking Contemporary Art Award 
2014: Redlands Konica Minolta Emerging Art Prize
2015: Brett Whiteley Travelling Art Scholarship 
2015: Parramatta City Council Creative Fellowship
2016: Residency at the Cité internationale des arts, Paris
2016: Associate Artist Residency with Acme Studios, London
2017: Finalist, Sir John Sulman Prize
2018: His portrait of artist Joan Ross, entitled I once thought I'd do anything for you (Joan), was a finalist in the Archibald Prize.

Selected exhibitions
His work has been represented in many exhibitions, including:
The National 2021: New Australian Art
The 2022 Adelaide Biennial

References

External links

1965 births
Living people

Australian contemporary artists

Archibald Prize finalists